Evans, Moore, and Woodbridge was an American architectural firm in early to mid-twentieth-century New York City. Through partner, Frederick James Woodbridge, FAIA, it was a predecessor firms Adams and Woodbridge, which estimated in 1953 that the firm and its predecessors (including Evans, Moore & Woodbridge, Adams & Prentice (1929–1941), and Malmfeldt, Adams & Woodbridge) had been responsible for "about 100 residences and alterations."

Works as Evans, Moore & Woodbridge
1928: Roger Ascham School, White Plains, New York
1929: Committee Health Center, Middletown, New Jersey, $25,000
1929: Keene Valley Church, Keene Valley, New York $25,000
1932: Smith College Alumnae House, Northampton, Massachusetts, $285,000 or $300,000
Princeton University Faculty Housing, Princeton, New Jersey
R.T. Swaine Residence, Lewisboro, New York (as Evans, Moore & Woodbridge) 
Morrow Library, Amherst, Massachusetts
H. Matthew Residence, Brewster, New York

Works as Malmfeldt, Adams & Woodbridge
1932: Wethersfield Church Home, Wethersfield, Connecticut, $100,000

References

External links
 Evans, Moore & Woodbridge archival card catalog. Held by the Department of Drawings & Archives, Avery Architectural & Fine Arts Library, Columbia University.
 

Companies based in Manhattan
Defunct architecture firms based in New York City
American ecclesiastical architects
American residential architects